Burck is a surname; notable people with this surname include:

 Jacob Burck (1907–1982), American political cartoonist
 Joachim a Burck (1546–1610; also Joachim von Burgk, sometimes Joachim Moller), German composer
 Robert John Burck (born 1970), the Naked Cowboy from Times Square, New York City
 William Burck (1848–1910), Dutch botanist

See also
 Berck
 Berk (disambiguation)
 Birck
 Burk (disambiguation)
 Burke (disambiguation)